is a Japanese football player. He plays for Fagiano Okayama on loan from FC Ryukyu.

Club statistics
Updated to end of 2018 season.

References

External links
Profile at FC Ryukyu

1993 births
Living people
Nippon Sport Science University alumni
Association football people from Hiroshima Prefecture
Japanese footballers
J3 League players
J2 League players
FC Ryukyu players
Fagiano Okayama players
Association football defenders